Zeller Bach is a small river in the Upper Austrian region Salzkammergut. It is a tributary of the Irrsee, which is drained by the Zeller Ache.

References

Rivers of Upper Austria
Rivers of Austria